Iyowujwa Chorote is a Matacoan language spoken by about 2,000 people, mostly in Argentina where it is spoken by about 1,500 people; 50% of whom are monolingual.

Alternate names include: Choroti, Manjuy, and Manjui. It is distinct from the similarly named Iyojwaʼja Chorote.

There are about 370 speakers in Paraguay and 8 in Bolivia. Of the 650 in Paraguay, approximately 480 are considered monolingual. These speakers in Paraguay only refer to themselves as Manjui or Inkijwas.  They refer to the Chorote residing in Argentina as Iyoawujwa (those who say awujwa), though some who reside with these people in Argentina have migrated from Paraguay.  Most of the Manjui under 40 years old can read and write in their own language and were taught in their own schools.  The principal location of these people is a settlement called Santa Rosa, in the province of Boquerón.  Other locations include Mcal. Estigarribia, Pedro P. Peña, and Yakaquash.

Phonology

Vowels 

Chorote has 6 vowels.

Consonants 
Chorote has 19 consonants.

References

External links
ELAR archive of Chorote (and Nivaclé and Kadiwéu) language documentation materials
Argentinian Languages Collection of Ana Gerzenstein, containing audio recordings of Chorote, at the Archive of the Indigenous Languages of Latin America.
Chorote (Intercontinental Dictionary Series)

Languages of Argentina
Languages of Paraguay
Languages of Bolivia
Matacoan languages
Chaco linguistic area